Club Deportivo Linares was a Spanish football team based in Linares, Jaén, in the autonomous community of Andalusia. Founded in 1990 and dissolved in July 2009, it played its last season in 2008–09, in Second Division B - Group 4. The team's stadium was Estadio de Linarejos, with a capacity of 10,000 seats.

History
Club Deportivo Linares was founded in 1990 with Miguel Hernández as its first president, first reaching the fourth division four years later, with a brief spell in the third level in 2000–01 – immediate relegation back.

On 21 July 2009, after seven consecutive seasons in Segunda B, the mayor of Linares, Juan Fernández, announced the club's defunction, due to the impossibility of paying its debt (around €4.7 million). It managed to play another seven seasons in division three.

On 5 August, Linares' new managing board confirmed the registration in the fourth category but, eventually, the Royal Spanish Football Federation forced the team to disappear.

Club background
SG Linarense – (1909–20)
Linares FC – (1920–29)
Gimnástica Linarense – (1929–31)
Linares Deportivo (I) – (1940–46)
Atlético Linares – (1946–48)
CD Linares (I) – (1952–64)
Linares CF – (1961–90)
CD Linares (II) – (1990–2009)
Linares Deportivo (II) – (2009–present)

Season to season

8 seasons in Segunda División B
7 seasons in Tercera División
4 seasons in Categorías Regionales

Last squad

Famous players

References

External links
Official website 

Defunct football clubs in Andalusia
Association football clubs established in 1990
Association football clubs disestablished in 2009
1990 establishments in Spain
2009 disestablishments in Spain